Ballastny Kuryer is a rural locality (a settlement) in Slavgorod, Altai Krai, Russia. The population was 140 as of 2013. There are 3 streets.

References 

Rural localities in Slavgorod urban okrug